The Ladies' National Football League is an annual inter-county ladies' Gaelic football tournament, secondary to the All-Ireland Senior Ladies' Football Championship. It is competed for annually by the county teams of Ireland.

National League roll of honour

The tournament was unfinished in 2020.

Finals

References

 
1979 establishments in Ireland
Gaelic football leagues in Ireland
!
Sports leagues established in 1979
Gaelic